Stepps, Chryston and Muirhead is one of the twenty-one wards used to elect members of the North Lanarkshire Council. It currently elects three councillors and, as its name suggests, covers the settlements of Stepps, Chryston and Muirhead (as well as Auchinloch) with a combined population of 12,290 in 2019.

It was created in 2007 as Strathkelvin, covering a larger territory also including Gartcosh and Moodiesburn (the eastern boundary being the M73 motorway) and returning four councillors. A nationwide boundary review in 2017 that recommended more representation for the area overall led to these communities being placed in a separate new ward (along with Glenboig from the Coatbridge North ward), with the remainder of the Strathkelvin ward renamed and returning one fewer councillor. A specific review in 2019 caused the addition of a few streets of modern housing at Cardowan which had been in the North East ward of the Glasgow City Council area, re-allocating them to North Lanarkshire along with the rest of the developments in that area, addressing an anomaly dating back to when the boundary crossed open fields.

Councillors

Election Results

2017 Election

 

On 22 May 2018, Conservative councillor Stephen Goldsack was expelled from the party after previous connections to the British National Party were exposed.

2012 Election

SNP councillor Frances McGlinchey resigned from the party on 24 October 2012 in protest at the vote to overturn its long-standing opposition to Nato.

2007 Election

References

Wards of North Lanarkshire